This is a partial list of notable current and former motocross riders, many of whom have competed in the World Championships, National Championships, and supercross competitions.

A

B

C

D

E

F

G

H

J

K

L

M

N

P

R

S

T

V

W

World Championships by nationality